is an athletic stadium in Okinawa, Okinawa Prefecture, Japan.

It is one of the home stadium of football club FC Ryukyu. It has a seating capacity of 13,400.

References

External links
Official site

Okinawa, Okinawa
Sports venues in Okinawa Prefecture
Football venues in Japan
Sports venues completed in 1973
1973 establishments in Japan
FC Ryukyu
Athletics (track and field) venues in Japan